Medhat may refer to:

Medhat Abdel-Hady (born 1974), retired Egyptian footballer
Mohamed Medhat Bahgat (born 1926), Egyptian basketball player
Medhat Haroun (1951–2012), Egyptian-American expert on earthquake engineering
Mohamed Medhat Hassanein, Minister of Finance of Egypt from 2001 to 2004
Adham Medhat (born 1975), Egyptian sport shooter
Kamal Medhat (1951–2009), the deputy representative of the Palestinian Liberation Organization (PLO) in Lebanon
Medhat al-Mahmoud (born 1933), head of the Iraqi Supreme Judicial Council, Chief Justice of Iraq
Mohammed Medhat (born 1989), Qatari footballer
Ramez Medhat (born 1999), Egyptian professional footballer
Sherif Medhat (born 1988), Egyptian professional footballer
Medhat Youssef Mohamed (1927–2001), Egyptian basketball player
Medhat Pasha (1822–1883), Ottoman democrat, leading statesman during the late Tanzimat period
Mohsen Medhat Warda (born 1955), Egyptian basketball player

See also
Medhat Pasha Souq, a historically important souq in the Street Called Straight, Damascus, Syria
Mehat
Midhat